Project Sapphire was a successful 1994 covert operation of the United States government in cooperation with the Kazakhstan government to reduce the threat of nuclear proliferation by removing nuclear material from Kazakhstan as part of the Cooperative Threat Reduction Program, which was authorized by the Soviet Nuclear Threat Reduction Act of 1991.

A warehouse at the Ulba Metallurgical Plant outside Ust-Kamenogorsk housed  of weapons grade enriched uranium to fuel Alfa class submarines (90% U-235). Following the dissolution of the Soviet Union, the fuel was poorly documented and secured, and in danger of being sold for use in the construction of nuclear weapons. This mission stands as a successful attempt of a country secretly moving in to another country to protect them from the dangers of nuclear weapons left behind by the Soviet Union.

Background 
Careless nuclear testing in the northeast of Kazakhstan as a result of the Cold War and the arms race between the Soviet Union and the United States resulted in the spread of belief in 'nuclear neuralgia' amongst the country's citizens. The development of these health issues as well as the adoption of Gorbachev's glasnost campaign sparked a public anti-nuclear movement in Kazakhstan. The independence of Kazakhstan also saw the rise of leaders who sought to differentiate themselves from the former communist nation. Once a part of the USSR, Kazakhstan was very reliant on relations with Russia in the 90's. With millions of ethnic Russians living in the country, leaders of Kazakhstan did not want to create trouble because of Russia's influence on their economics, factories, and technology. They also wanted to remove post-Soviet nuclear materials because Kazakhstan lacked the facilities and technical capacity to sustain nuclear weapons. Prior to the collapse of the USSR, Kazakhstan's first president Nazarbayev announced that the country would be a non-nuclear state once it was admitted into the United Nations. In May 1992, Nazarbayev joined the Treaty on the Non-Proliferation of Nuclear Weapons. Further conversations with America's president George H. W. Bush and senators Richard Lugar and Sam Nunn created stronger ties between Kazakhstan and America. Finally economics pushed Kazakhstan towards de-nuclearization because the country's large oil reserves could only be sourced by Western technology. Obtaining this western support would only be possible with non-nuclear proliferation and joining the NPT.

The Nunn–Lugar Cooperative Threat Reduction program was established in 1986 in order to minimize the threat of nuclear proliferation especially in Asia and the Soviet Union. The Nunn-Lugar Act was inspired and sponsored by Sam Nunn and Richard Lugar to take on Project Sapphire and dismantle nuclear weapons in Former Soviet blocs as showed in Kazakhstan.

Event 
The fall of the Soviet Union left nuclear weapons materials spread across developing countries. Two United States Senators, Sam Nunn and Richard Lugar, in office at the time, saw the importance of monitoring the location of these materials, so that they could help prevent nuclear proliferation. It was a fear that the lack of monitoring would result in the aid of underdeveloped or threatening countries that did not previously have access to this weapons grade materials. In the early 1990s, the two senators were able to deduce a number of resources that Kazakhstan had because they became aware of the resources the Soviet Union had in the newly formed country. Kazakhstan's HEU was left behind by a Soviet submarine project and there was enough of the material to fuel 24 atomic bombs. The uranium-235 was 90-91% enriched in pure metal form.

After months of preparation, 31 agents forming the specialised Nuclear Emergency Recovery Team were recruited in October 1994 to embark on a covert mission to remove the uranium. On October 7, President Bill Clinton signed a classified directive to approve the airlift - composed of 3 C-5 aircraft - to leave from Delaware's Dover Air Force Base to Kazakhstan. The team spent 12 hours a day from October 14 to November 11 packing up uranium (including seven different types of uranium some laced with toxic beryllium). The project had to be under extreme secrecy or the entire mission would have been compromised. The team found 1032 containers in the warehouse and repacked the material into 448 shipping containers. Bad weather set in and on the way to the airport the trucks carrying the HEU were almost compromised due to the ice and sleet. Finally the plane was loaded and flown for 20 hours (the longest flight for a C-5 in U.S. history) back to Delaware.

On November 23, 1994, the Clinton Administration announced that the uranium had been removed.

Aftermath 
Since Project Sapphire, HEU has been removed from 20 research reactors from various former Soviet bloc nations. This project shows how through the United States' economic, diplomatic, and technical resources, Kazakhstan was able to draw closer in its effort to become a nonnuclear weapons state.

The effects from Project Sapphire are seen today in U.S. foreign policy and trade. The U.S.'s nuclear clean out  programs, such as the Nunn–Lugar Cooperative Threat Reduction, were vital to former Soviet countries such as Kazakhstan, Belarus, and Ukraine in that they prevented the proliferation of Post Soviet nuclear materials. There are currently 9 members in the nuclear club including The United States, Russia, the United Kingdom, France, China, India, Pakistan, Israel, and North Korea.

In popular culture 
In the novel Performance Anomalies, the clandestine removal of weapons-grade uranium under Project Sapphire was not complete, resulting in a secret cache of uranium in Kazakhstan that attracts jihadis.

There is also a movie about Project Sapphire, sharing its name, in development as of 2022.

See also 
 Nunn–Lugar Cooperative Threat Reduction—the source of the funds for Project Sapphire

References

Further reading 

  (Part of a series)
 "Project Sapphire 20th Anniversary."The National Security Archive. N.p., 17 Nov. 2014. Web. 17 May 2017.
 
 

Nuclear proliferation
Nursultan Nazarbayev
United States intelligence operations